Throughout 2013, 139 tropical cyclones formed in seven different areas called basins. Of these, 67 have been named by various weather agencies when they attained maximum sustained winds of 35 knots (65 km/h, 40 mph). The costliest tropical cyclone of the year was Hurricane Manuel, which was responsible for at least $4.2 billion worth of damages in Mexico. 21 major tropical cyclones formed in 2013, including five Category 5 tropical cyclones.

Global atmospheric and hydrological conditions

Summary

North Atlantic
The 2013 Atlantic hurricane season was a very inactive season, featuring only two hurricanes and no major hurricanes.

Eastern Pacific
The 2013 Pacific hurricane season featured nine hurricanes, including Hurricane Manuel, the costliest Pacific hurricane on record.

Western Pacific
The 2013 Pacific typhoon season was the most active season since the 2004 season, deadliest since 1975 and featured Typhoon Haiyan, one of the strongest tropical cyclones on record.

Systems

January

January was very active, featuring fourteen systems, with seven of them being named.

February

February was slightly above-average, featuring eleven systems, with five of them being named.

March

March was slightly below-average featuring eight systems, of which only two were named.

April

April was slightly below-average, with six systems forming, with three of them being named.

May

June

July

August

September

October

November

December

Global effects

See also

 Tropical cyclones by year
 List of earthquakes in 2013
 Tornadoes of 2013

Notes
1The "strength" of a tropical cyclone is measured by the minimum barometric pressure, not wind speed. Most meteorological organizations rate the intensity of a storm by this figure, so the lower the minimum pressure of the storm, the more intense or "stronger" it is considered to be.
2 Only systems that formed either on or after January 1, 2013 are counted in the seasonal totals.
3 Only systems that formed either before or on December 31, 2013 are counted in the seasonal totals.4 The wind speeds for this tropical cyclone/basin are based on the IMD Scale which uses 3-minute sustained winds.
5 The wind speeds for this tropical cyclone/basin are based on the Saffir Simpson Scale which uses 1-minute sustained winds.
6The wind speeds for this tropical cyclone are based on Météo-France which uses gust winds.

References

External links

Regional Specialized Meteorological Centers
 US National Hurricane Center – North Atlantic, Eastern Pacific
 Japan Meteorological Agency – NW Pacific
 India Meteorological Department – Bay of Bengal and the Arabian Sea
 Météo-France – La Reunion – South Indian Ocean from 30°E to 90°E
 Fiji Meteorological Service – South Pacific west of 160°E, north of 25° S

Tropical Cyclone Warning Centers
 Meteorology, Climatology, and Geophysical Agency of Indonesia – South Indian Ocean from 90°E to 141°E, generally north of 10°S
 Australian Bureau of Meteorology (TCWC's Perth, Darwin & Brisbane) – South Indian Ocean & South Pacific Ocean from 90°E to 160°E, generally south of 10°S
 Papua New Guinea National Weather Service – South Pacific Ocean from 141°E to 160°E, generally north of 10°S
 Meteorological Service of New Zealand Limited – South Pacific west of 160°E, south of 25°S

Tropical cyclones by year
2013 in science